Sarah Mawby (born 9 April 1965) is a British fencer. She competed in the women's team foil event at the 1992 Summer Olympics.

References

External links
 

1965 births
Living people
British female fencers
Olympic fencers of Great Britain
Fencers at the 1992 Summer Olympics
Sportspeople from Evanston, Illinois
American female foil fencers
21st-century American women